Observations of the planet Venus include those in antiquity, telescopic observations, and from visiting spacecraft. Spacecraft have performed various flybys, orbits, and landings on Venus, including balloon probes that floated in the atmosphere of Venus. Study of the planet is aided by its relatively close proximity to the Earth, compared to other planets, but the surface of Venus is obscured by an atmosphere opaque to visible light.

Historical observations and impact 

As one of the brightest objects in the sky, Venus has been known since prehistoric times, and as such, many ancient cultures recorded observations of the planet. A cylinder seal from the Jemdet Nasr period indicates that the ancient Sumerians already knew that the morning and evening stars were the same celestial object. The Sumerians named the planet after the goddess Inanna, who was known as Ishtar by the later Akkadians and Babylonians. She had a dual role as a goddess of both love and war, thereby representing a deity that presided over birth and death. One of the oldest surviving astronomical documents, from the Babylonian library of Ashurbanipal around 1600 BC, is a 21-year record of the appearances of Venus.

Because the movements of Venus appear to be discontinuous (it disappears due to its proximity to the sun, for many days at a time, and then reappears on the other horizon), some cultures did not immediately recognize Venus as single entity; instead, they assumed it to be two separate stars on each horizon: the morning star and the evening star. The Ancient Egyptians, for example, believed Venus to be two separate bodies and knew the morning star as Tioumoutiri and the evening star as Ouaiti. The evening star they called  (Latinized Hesperus) (the "star of the evening"). By Hellenistic times, the ancient Greeks identified it as a single planet, which they named after their goddess of love, Aphrodite, Phoenician Astarte, a planetary name that is retained in modern Greek. Hesperos was translated into Latin as Vesper and Phosphoros as Lucifer ("Light Bearer").

Venus was considered the most important celestial body observed by the Maya, who called it Chac ek, or Noh Ek', "the Great Star" and Xux Ek', the Wasp Star. The Maya based their religious calendar partially upon the movements of Venus and monitored its movements closely, including in the daytime. The positions of Venus and other planets were thought to influence life on Earth, so the Maya and other ancient Mesoamerican cultures timed wars and other important events based on their observations. In the Dresden Codex, the Maya included an almanac showing Venus's full cycle, in five sets of 584 days each (approximately eight years), after which the patterns repeated (since Venus has a synodic period of 583.92 days). The Maya were aware of this synodic period, and could compute it to within a hundredth part of a day.

Phases 

Because its orbit takes it between the Earth and the Sun, Venus as seen from Earth exhibits visible phases in much the same manner as the Earth's Moon. Galileo Galilei observed the phases of Venus in December 1610, an observation which supported Copernicus's then-contentious heliocentric description of the Solar System. He also noted changes in the size of Venus's visible diameter when it was in different phases, suggesting that it was farther from Earth when it was full and nearer when it was a crescent. This observation strongly supported the heliocentric model. Venus (and also Mercury) is not visible from Earth when it is full, since at that time it is at superior conjunction, rising and setting concomitantly with the Sun and hence lost in the Sun's glare.

Venus is brightest when approximately 25% of its disk is illuminated; this typically occurs 37 days both before (in the evening sky) and after (in the morning sky) its inferior conjunction. Its greatest elongations occur approximately 70 days before and after inferior conjunction, at which time it is half full; between these two intervals Venus is actually visible in broad daylight, if the observer knows specifically where to look for it. The planet's period of retrograde motion is 20 days on either side of the inferior conjunction. In fact, through a telescope Venus at greatest elongation appears less than half full due to Schröter's effect first noticed in 1793 and shown in 1996 as due to its thick atmosphere.

On rare occasions, Venus can actually be seen in both the morning (before sunrise) and evening (after sunset) on the same day. This scenario arises when Venus is at its maximum separation from the ecliptic and concomitantly at inferior conjunction; then one hemisphere (Northern or Southern) will be able to see it at both times. This opportunity presented itself most recently for Northern Hemisphere observers within a few days on either side of March 29, 2001, and for those in the Southern Hemisphere, on and around August 19, 1999. These respective events repeat themselves every eight years pursuant to the planet's synodic cycle.

Ground-based observations 

Transits of Venus directly between the Earth and the Sun's visible disc are rare astronomical events. The first such transit to be predicted and observed was the Transit of Venus, 1639, seen and recorded by English astronomers Jeremiah Horrocks and William Crabtree. The observation by Mikhail Lomonosov of the transit of 1761 provided the first evidence that Venus had an atmosphere, and the 19th-century observations of parallax during Venus transits allowed the distance between the Earth and Sun to be accurately calculated for the first time. Transits can only occur either in early June or early December, these being the points at which Venus crosses the ecliptic (the orbital plane of the Earth), and occur in pairs at eight-year intervals, with each such pair more than a century apart. The most recent pair of transits of Venus occurred in 2004 and 2012, while the prior pair occurred in 1874 and 1882.

In the 19th century, many observers stated that Venus had a period of rotation of roughly 24 hours. Italian astronomer Giovanni Schiaparelli was the first to predict a significantly slower rotation, proposing that Venus was tidally locked with the Sun (as he had also proposed for Mercury). While not actually true for either body, this was still a reasonably accurate estimate. The near-resonance between its rotation and its closest approach to Earth helped to create this impression, as Venus always seemed to be facing the same direction when it was in the best location for observations to be made. The rotation rate of Venus was first measured during the 1961 conjunction, observed by radar from a 26 m antenna at Goldstone, California, the Jodrell Bank Radio Observatory in the UK, and the Soviet deep space facility in Yevpatoria, Crimea. Accuracy was refined at each subsequent conjunction, primarily from measurements made from Goldstone and Eupatoria. The fact that rotation was retrograde was not confirmed until 1964.

Before radio observations in the 1960s, many believed that Venus contained a lush, Earth-like environment. This was due to the planet's size and orbital radius, which suggested a fairly Earth-like situation as well as to the thick layer of clouds which prevented the surface from being seen. Among the speculations on Venus were that it had a jungle-like environment or that it had oceans of either petroleum or carbonated water. However, microwave observations by C. Mayer et al., indicated a high-temperature source (600 K). Strangely, millimetre-band observations made by A. D. Kuzmin indicated much lower temperatures. Two competing theories explained the unusual radio spectrum, one suggesting the high temperatures originated in the ionosphere, and another suggesting a hot planetary surface.

In September 2020 a team at Cardiff University announced that observations of Venus using the James Clerk Maxwell Telescope and Atacama Large Millimeter Array in 2017 and 2019 indicated that the Venusian atmosphere contained phosphine (PH3) in concentrations 10,000 times higher than those that could be ascribed to any known non-biological source on Venus. This could have indicated the potential presence of biological organisms on Venus, however, this measurement was later shown to be in error.

Terrestrial radar mapping 
After the Moon, Venus was the second object in the Solar System to be explored by radar from the Earth. The first studies were carried out in 1961 at NASA's Goldstone Observatory, part of the Deep Space Network. At successive inferior conjunctions, Venus was observed both by Goldstone and the National Astronomy and Ionosphere Center in Arecibo. The studies carried out were similar to the earlier measurement of transits of the meridian, which had revealed in 1963 that the rotation of Venus was retrograde (it rotates in the opposite direction to that in which it orbits the Sun). The radar observations also allowed astronomers to determine that the rotation period of Venus was 243.1 days, and that its axis of rotation was almost perpendicular to its orbital plane.

Interest in the geological characteristics of Venus was stimulated by the refinement of imaging techniques between 1970 and 1985. Early radar observations suggested merely that the surface of Venus was more compacted than the dusty surface of the Moon. The first radar images taken from the Earth showed very bright (radar-reflective) highlands christened Alpha Regio, Beta Regio, and Maxwell Montes; improvements in radar techniques later achieved an image resolution of 1–2 kilometres.

Observation by spacecraft

There have been numerous unmanned missions to Venus. Ten Soviet probes have achieved a soft landing on the surface, with up to 110 minutes of communication from the surface, all without return. Launch windows occur every 19 months.

Early flybys

On February 12, 1961, the Soviet spacecraft Venera 1 was the first flyby probe launched to another planet. An overheated orientation sensor caused it to malfunction, losing contact with Earth before its closest approach to Venus of 100,000 km. However, the probe was first to combine all the necessary features of an interplanetary spacecraft: solar panels, parabolic telemetry antenna, 3-axis stabilization, course-correction engine, and the first launch from parking orbit.

The first successful flyby Venus probe was the American Mariner 2 spacecraft, which flew past Venus in 1962, coming within 35,000 km.

The Soviet Union launched the Zond 1 probe to Venus in 1964, but it malfunctioned sometime after its May 16 telemetry session.

During another American flyby in 1967, Mariner 5 measured the strength of Venus's magnetic field. In 1974, Mariner 10 swung by Venus on its way to Mercury and took ultraviolet photographs of the clouds, revealing the extraordinarily high wind speeds in the Venusian atmosphere.

Early landings

On March 1, 1966, the Venera 3 Soviet space probe crash-landed on Venus, becoming the first spacecraft to reach the surface of another planet. Its sister craft Venera 2 had failed due to overheating shortly before completing its flyby mission.

The descent capsule of Venera 4 entered the atmosphere of Venus on October 18, 1967, making it the first probe to return direct measurements from another planet's atmosphere. The capsule measured temperature, pressure, density and performed 11 automatic chemical experiments to analyze the atmosphere. It discovered that the atmosphere of Venus was 95% carbon dioxide, and in combination with radio occultation data from the Mariner 5 probe, showed that surface pressures were far greater than expected (75 to 100 atmospheres).

These results were verified and refined by the Venera 5 and Venera 6 in May 1969. But thus far, none of these missions had reached the surface while still transmitting. Venera 4s battery ran out while still slowly floating through the massive atmosphere, and Venera 5 and 6 were crushed by high pressure 18 km (60,000 ft) above the surface.

The first successful landing on Venus was by Venera 7 on December 15, 1970 — the first successful soft (non-crash) landing on another planet, as well as the first successful transmission of data from another planet’s surface to Earth. Venera 8 landed on July 22, 1972. A gamma ray spectrometer analyzed the chemical composition of the crust.

Lander/orbiter pairs

 Venera 9 and 10 

The Soviet probe Venera 9 entered orbit on October 22, 1975, becoming the first artificial satellite of Venus. A battery of cameras and spectrometers returned information about the planet's clouds, ionosphere and magnetosphere, as well as performing bi-static radar measurements of the surface. The  descent vehicle separated from Venera 9 and landed, taking the first pictures of the surface and analyzing the crust with a gamma ray spectrometer and a densitometer. During descent, pressure, temperature and photometric measurements were made, as well as backscattering and multi-angle scattering (nephelometer) measurements of cloud density. It was discovered that the clouds of Venus are formed in three distinct layers. On October 25, Venera 10 arrived and carried out a similar program of study.

 Pioneer Venus 

In 1978, NASA sent two Pioneer spacecraft to Venus. The Pioneer mission consisted of two components, launched separately: an orbiter and a multiprobe. The Pioneer Venus Multiprobe carried one large and three small atmospheric probes. The large probe was released on November 16, 1978, and the three small probes on November 20. All four probes entered the Venusian atmosphere on December 9, followed by the delivery vehicle. Although not expected to survive the descent through the atmosphere, one probe continued to operate for 45 minutes after reaching the surface. The Pioneer Venus Orbiter was inserted into an elliptical orbit around Venus on December 4, 1978. It carried 17 experiments and operated until the fuel used to maintain its orbit was exhausted and atmospheric entry destroyed the spacecraft in August 1992.

 Further Soviet missions 
Also in 1978, Venera 11 and Venera 12 flew past Venus, dropping descent vehicles on December 21 and December 25 respectively. The landers carried colour cameras and a soil drill and analyzer, which unfortunately malfunctioned. Each lander made measurements with a nephelometer, mass spectrometer, gas chromatograph, and a cloud-droplet chemical analyzer using X-ray fluorescence that unexpectedly discovered a large proportion of chlorine in the clouds, in addition to sulfur. Strong lightning activity was also detected.

In 1982, the Soviet Venera 13 sent the first colour image of Venus's surface and analysed the X-ray fluorescence of an excavated soil sample. The probe operated for a record 127 minutes on the planet's hostile surface. Also in 1982, the Venera 14 lander detected possible seismic activity in the planet's crust.

In December 1984, during the apparition of Halley's Comet, the Soviet Union launched the two Vega probes to Venus.
Vega 1 and Vega 2 encountered Venus in June 1985, each deploying a lander and an instrumented helium balloon. The balloon-borne aerostat probes floated at about 53 km altitude for 46 and 60 hours respectively, traveling about 1/3 of the way around the planet and allowing scientists to study the dynamics of the most active part of Venus's atmosphere. These measured wind speed, temperature, pressure and cloud density. More turbulence and convection activity than expected was discovered, including occasional plunges of 1 to 3 km in downdrafts.

The landing vehicles carried experiments focusing on cloud aerosol composition and structure. Each carried an ultraviolet absorption spectrometer, aerosol particle-size analyzers, and devices for collecting aerosol material and analyzing it with a mass spectrometer, a gas chromatograph, and an X-ray fluorescence spectrometer. The upper two layers of the clouds were found to be sulfuric acid droplets, but the lower layer is probably composed of phosphoric acid solution. The crust of Venus was analyzed with the soil drill experiment and a gamma ray spectrometer. As the landers carried no cameras on board, no images were returned from the surface. They would be the last probes to land on Venus for decades. The Vega spacecraft continued to rendezvous with Halley's Comet nine months later, bringing an additional 14 instruments and cameras for that mission.

The multiaimed Soviet Vesta mission, developed in cooperation with European countries for realisation in 1991–1994 but canceled due to the Soviet Union disbanding, included the delivery of balloons and a small lander to Venus, according to the first plan.

Orbiters

Venera 15 and 16

In October 1983, Venera 15 and Venera 16 entered polar orbits around Venus. The images had a  resolution, comparable to those obtained by the best Earth radars. Venera 15 analyzed and mapped the upper atmosphere with an infrared Fourier spectrometer. From November 11, 1983, to July 10, 1984, both satellites mapped the northern third of the planet with synthetic aperture radar. These results provided the first detailed understanding of the surface geology of Venus, including the discovery of unusual massive shield volcanoes such as coronae and arachnoids. Venus had no evidence of plate tectonics, unless the northern third of the planet happened to be a single plate. The altimetry data obtained by the Venera missions had a resolution four times better than Pioneer'''s.

Magellan

On August 10, 1990, the American Magellan probe, named after the explorer Ferdinand Magellan, arrived at its orbit around the planet and started a mission of detailed radar mapping at a frequency of 2.38 GHz. Whereas previous probes had created low-resolution radar maps of continent-sized formations, Magellan mapped 98% of the surface with a resolution of approximately 100 m. The resulting maps were comparable to visible-light photographs of other planets, and are still the most detailed in existence. Magellan greatly improved scientific understanding of the geology of Venus: the probe found no signs of plate tectonics, but the scarcity of impact craters suggested the surface was relatively young, and there were lava channels thousands of kilometers long. After a four-year mission, Magellan, as planned, plunged into the atmosphere on October 11, 1994, and partly vaporized; some sections are thought to have hit the planet's surface.

Venus ExpressVenus Express was a mission by the European Space Agency to study the atmosphere and surface characteristics of Venus from orbit. The design was based on ESA's Mars Express and Rosetta missions. The probe's main objective was the long-term observation of the Venusian atmosphere, which it is hoped will also contribute to an understanding of Earth's atmosphere and climate. It also made global maps of Venerean surface temperatures, and attempted to observe signs of life on Earth from a distance.Venus Express successfully assumed a polar orbit on April 11, 2006. The mission was originally planned to last for two Venusian years (about 500 Earth days), but was extended to the end of 2014 until its propellant was exhausted. Some of the first results emerging from Venus Express include evidence of past oceans, the discovery of a huge double atmospheric vortex at the south pole, and the detection of hydroxyl in the atmosphere.

AkatsukiAkatsuki was launched on May 20, 2010, by JAXA, and was planned to enter Venusian orbit in December 2010. However, the orbital insertion maneuver failed and the spacecraft was left in heliocentric orbit. It was placed on an alternative elliptical Venerian orbit on 7 December 2015 by firing its attitude control thrusters for 1233-seconds. The probe will image the surface in ultraviolet, infrared, microwaves, and radio, and look for evidence of lightning and volcanism on the planet. Astronomers working on the mission reported detecting a possible gravity wave that occurred on the planet Venus in December 2015.

Flybys

Several space probes en route to other destinations have used flybys of Venus to increase their speed via the gravitational slingshot method. These include the Galileo mission to Jupiter, and the Cassini–Huygens mission to Saturn, which made two flybys. During Cassinis examination of the radio frequency emissions of Venus with its radio and plasma wave science instrument during both the 1998 and 1999 flybys, it reported no high-frequency radio waves (0.125 to 16 MHz), which are commonly associated with lightning. This was in direct opposition to the findings of the Soviet Venera missions 20 years earlier. It was postulated that perhaps if Venus did have lightning, it might be some type of low-frequency electrical activity, because radio signals cannot penetrate the ionosphere at frequencies below about 1 megahertz. An examination of Venus's radio emissions by the Galileo spacecraft during its flyby in 1990 was interpreted at the time to be indicative of lightning. However, the Galileo probe was over 60 times further from Venus than Cassini was during its flyby, making its observations substantially less significant. In 2007, the Venus Express mission confirmed the presence of lightning on Venus, finding that it is more common on Venus than it is on Earth.MESSENGER passed by Venus twice on its way to Mercury. The first time, it flew by on October 24, 2006, passing 3000 km from Venus. As Earth was on the other side of the Sun, no data was recorded. The second flyby was on July 6, 2007, where the spacecraft passed only 325 km from the cloudtops.

BepiColombo flew by Venus on October 15th, 2020. During its second flyby of Venus, which occurred August 10th 2021, BepiColombo came 552 km near Venus' surface, and then afterwards left the planet's orbit and arrived at Mercury at a later date. While BepiColombo approached Venus before making its second flyby of the planet, two monitoring cameras and seven science instruments were switched on.

 Future missions 

The Venera-D spacecraft was proposed to Roscosmos in 2003 and the concept has been matured since then. It will be launched in 2029 and its prime purpose is to map Venus's surface using a powerful radar. The mission would also include a lander capable to function for a long duration on the surface. As of late 2018, NASA is working with Russia on the mission concept, but the collaboration has not been formalized.

India's ISRO is developing the Shukrayaan-1 orbiter concept, which as of 2018, is in the configuration phase. It is proposed to be launched in 2023, but its funding has not yet been requested.BepiColombo, launched in 2018 to study Mercury, made two flybys of Venus, on October 15, 2020, and August 10, 2021. Johannes Benkhoff, project scientist, believes BepiColombo's MERTIS (Mercury Radiometer and Thermal Infrared Spectrometer) could possibly detect phosphine, but "we do not know if our instrument is sensitive enough".

In June 2021, NASA announced two potential missions to Venus, VERITAS, an orbiter, and DAVINCI+, a combination orbiter/lander mission, both of the Discovery class.

On October 6, 2021, the United Arab Emirates announced its intention to send a probe to Venus as soon as 2028. The probe would make observations of the planet while using it for a gravity assist to propel it to the Asteroid belt.

In 2022, China's CNSA revealed the VOICE orbiter mission (Venus Volcano Imaging and Climate Explorer) launching in 2026 and arrive in Venus by 2027. VOICE's mission was expected to last 3-4 years and including the following payloads, a Microwave Radiometric Sounder (MRS), Polarimetric Synthetic Aperture Radar (PolSAR), and Ultraviolet-Visible-Near Infrared Multispectral Imager (UVN-MSI). The probe would return images of the surface with one-meter resolution and search the clouds for habitability and biosignatures.

 Timeline of Venus exploration 

Unofficial names used during development are listed in italics.

Past missions

Current missions

Missions under study

 Proposals 
 

To overcome the high pressure and temperature at the surface, a team led by Geoffrey Landis of NASA's Glenn Research Center produced a concept in 2007 of a solar-powered aircraft that would control a resistant surface rover on the ground. The aircraft would carry the mission's sensitive electronics in the relatively mild temperatures of Venus' upper atmosphere.

In 2020 NASA's JPL launched an open competition, titled "Exploring Hell: Avoiding Obstacles on a Clockwork Rover", to design a sensor that could work on Venus's surface.

Other examples of mission concepts and proposals include:

 Impact 
Research on the atmosphere of Venus has produced significant insights not only about its own state but also about the atmospheres of other planetary objects, especially of Earth. It has helped to find and understand the depletion of Earth's ozone in the 1970s and 1980s.

The voyage of James Cook and his crew of HMS Endeavour to observe the Venus transit of 1769 brought about the claiming of Australia at Possession Island for colonisation by Europeans.

 See also 
 Aspects of Venus
 Manned Venus Flyby

 Notes 

In Isaiah 14:12 in the Latin Vulgate translation of the Bible, Jerome translated the Greek term heosphoros in the Septuagint and the Hebrew term helel in the Hebrew Bible as lucifer, meaning "light bearer". Later English translators, influenced by the Vulgate's rendering of lucifer for helel'', introduced Lucifer with a capital into the English translations of the Bible, thereby changing the Latin descriptive term to a personal name. This has caused "Lucifer" to become viewed as a code name for Satan, instead of being a descriptive term by which Isaiah compared the Babylonian king to the bright planet Venus.

References

External links 
 Double vortex at Venus South Pole unveiled!
 Planetary Missions at National Space Science Data Center (NASA)
 Soviet Venus-rover ХМ-ВД2
 Exploring Venus by Solar Airplane – G. Landis

Venus
Spaceflight
Discovery and exploration of the Solar System